Nebria chelmosensis is a species of ground beetle from Nebriinae subfamily that is endemic to Greece.

References

chelmosensis
Beetles described in 1944
Beetles of Europe
Endemic fauna of Greece